Przewalski's toadhead agama (Phrynocephalus przewalskii), also known as Tsarewsky's toadhead agama, or Steindachner's toadhead agama, is a species of agamid lizard found in China and Mongolia. This species was named after Nikolay Przhevalsky, a Russian Imperial geographer and explorer of Central and East Asia.

Description
P. przewalkskii is one of the 44 recognized species within the genus Phrynocephalus. Adults may attain a snout-to-vent length (SVL) of about 61 mm (2.4 in) and weigh 7.2g  on average. It sports a sand or gray colored body with a white underside. Sparse black specks or small spots are present on their head and body. Some individuals have denser spotting on the tops of their heads as well as a black stripe down the middle of their back. This pattern is more pronounced in adult males of the species.

Distribution and habitat
It is most common in desert habitats of northwestern China, but specimens have also been spotted in Mongolia. It appears to prefer habitats with low moisture and high vegetation cover.

Behavior
Przewalski's toadhead agamas are diurnal. They are insectivores and females lay 1-7 eggs per clutch.

References

przewalskii
Reptiles described in 1876
Taxa named by Alexander Strauch